Rien que les heures (English: Nothing But Time or Nothing But the Hours) is a 1926 experimental silent film by Brazilian director Alberto Cavalcanti showing the life of Paris through one day in 45 minutes.

Other noted examples of the city-symphony genre include Charles Sheeler and Paul Strand's Manhatta (1921), Walter Ruttmann's Berlin: Symphony of a Metropolis (1927), Andre Sauvage's Etudes sur Paris (1928), and Dziga Vertov's Man With a Movie Camera (1929).

See also 
List of films made in France 1919-1940

References

External links 

1926 films
French silent feature films
Films directed by Alberto Cavalcanti
Documentary films about Paris
1926 documentary films
Black-and-white documentary films
French documentary films
French black-and-white films
1920s French films